Socialism: Past and Future is a 1989 book written by Michael Harrington, with an introduction by Irving Howe.

Synopsis
Michael Harrington presents an outline of socialism in response to the growing collapse of Communist governments and presents an alternative model of socialism.

References

1992 non-fiction books
Books about socialism